|}

The Spring Juvenile Hurdle is a Grade 1 National Hunt hurdle race in Ireland. It is run at Leopardstown Racecourse in February, over a distance of 2 miles. The race is restricted to four-year-old horses only and is usually contested by horses who go on to run in the Triumph Hurdle at the Cheltenham Festival.

The race was first run in 1994 as a Listed event, replacing the Le Coq Hardi Hurdle, a Grade 3 all-aged 2 mile Novice Hurdle.  It was raised to Grade 3 in 1995, to Grade 2 in 2003 and has been a Grade 1 event since 2010.

Records
Leading jockey since 1994 (3 wins):
 Paul Carberry – Shirley's Delight (1994), Sungazer (2000), Power Elite (2004)
 Barry Geraghty - Personal Column (2008), Guitar Pete (2014), A Wave of the Sea (2020)
 Paul Townend -  Unaccompanied (2011),  Mr Adjudicator (2018), Vauban (2022) Leading trainer since 1994 (6 wins):
 Willie Mullins -  Mister Hight (2006), Petite Parisienne (2015), Footpad (2016), Mr Adjudicator (2018), Vauban (2022), Gala Marceau (2023) ''

Winners

See also
 Horse racing in Ireland
 List of Irish National Hunt races

References
 Racing Post:

National Hunt races in Ireland
National Hunt hurdle races
Leopardstown Racecourse
Recurring sporting events established in 1994
1994 establishments in Ireland